The 2008 Firestone Indy 200 was the eleventh round of the 2008 IndyCar Series season. It took place on July 12, 2008, at the Nashville Superspeedway.  It was the eighth and final running of the Firestone Indy 200.

Race results

Firestone Indy 200
Firestone Indy 200
Firestone Indy 200
Firestone Indy 200